Hun Sen (born 5 August 1952) is a Cambodian politician and former military commander who has been the prime minister of Cambodia since 1998. He is the longest-serving head of government of Cambodia, and one of the longest-serving leaders in the world. He is also the president of the Cambodian People's Party (CPP) and a member of the National Assembly for Kandal. His full honorary title is Samdech Akka Moha Sena Padei Techo Hun Sen (meaning "Lord Prime Minister and Supreme Military Commander Hun Sen").

Born Hun Bunal, he changed his name to Hun Sen in 1972, two years after joining the Khmer Rouge as a soldier. He fought for the Khmer Rouge in the Cambodian Civil War and was a Battalion Commander in Democratic Kampuchea until defecting in 1977 and fighting alongside Vietnamese forces in the Cambodian–Vietnamese War. From 1979 to 1986 and again from 1987 to 1990, he served as Cambodia's foreign minister in the Vietnamese occupied government. At age 26, he was also the world's youngest foreign minister.
 
Hun Sen rose to the premiership in January 1985 when the one-party National Assembly appointed him to succeed Chan Sy, who had died in office in December 1984. He held the position until the 1993 UN-backed elections which resulted in a hung parliament, with opposition party FUNCINPEC winning the majority of votes. Sen refused to accept the result. After negotiations with FUNCINPEC, Norodom Ranariddh and Hun Sen agreed to simultaneously serve as First and Second Prime Minister, until the coalition broke down and Sen orchestrated a coup d'état in 1997 which toppled Ranariddh. Since 1998, Hun Sen has led the CPP to consecutive and often contentious election victories, overseeing rapid economic growth and development, but also corruption, deforestation and human rights violations. In 2013, Hun Sen and the CPP were reelected with a significantly reduced majority. Allegations of voter fraud led to widespread anti-government protests. In 2018 he was elected to a sixth term in a largely unopposed poll after the dissolution of the opposition party, with the CPP winning every seat in the National Assembly. He is currently serving in his sixth term as prime minister in de facto one-party rule.

Hun Sen has been prominent in communist, Marxist–Leninist and now state capitalist and national conservative political parties, and although Khmer nationalism has been a consistent trait of all of them, he is thought to lack a core political ideology. In foreign policy, Sen has in recent years strengthened a close diplomatic and economic alliance with China, which has undertaken large-scale infrastructure projects and investments in Cambodia under the Belt and Road Initiative. Meanwhile, Sen has frequently criticized Western powers in response to their sanctions on Cambodia over human rights issues and has overseen a number of diplomatic disputes with neighboring Thailand.

He has been described as a "wily operator who destroys his political opponents" by The Sydney Morning Herald and as a dictator who has assumed highly centralized power in Cambodia and considerable personal wealth using violence and corruption, including a personal guard said to rival the country's regular army.

Early life

Hun Sen was born on August 5, 1952, in Peam Kaoh Sna, Kampong Cham as Hun Bunal (also called Hun Nal), the third of six children. His father, Hun Neang, had been a resident monk in a local Wat in Kampong Cham province before defrocking himself to join the French resistance and marry Hun Sen's mother, Dee Yon, in the 1940s. Hun Neang's paternal grandparents were wealthy landowners of Teochew Chinese heritage.

Hun Neang inherited some of his family assets, including several hectares of land, and led a relatively comfortable life until a kidnapping incident forced their family to sell off much of their assets. Hun Nal left his family at the age of 13 to attend a monastic school in Phnom Penh. At the time, he changed his name to Ritthi Sen or simply Sen; his prior given name, Nal, was often a nickname for overweight children.

Military career and entry to politics
When Lon Nol removed Norodom Sihanouk from power in 1970, Sen gave up his education to join the Khmer Rouge following Sihanouk's call to join the insurgency. Sen also claims he was inspired to fight against foreign interference when his hometown of Memot was bombed by U.S. aircraft in Operation Menu. Sen claims he had no political opinions or ideology at the time. As a soldier, he again changed his name, this time to Hun Samrach, to conceal his identity.

He changed his name to Hun Sen two years later, saying that the name Hun Samrach had been inauspicious and that he had been wounded several times during the period he had that name. Sen rapidly ascended ranks as a soldier, and fought during the fall of Phnom Penh, becoming injured and being hospitalized for some time and sustaining a permanent eye injury.

In Democratic Kampuchea, Sen served as a Battalion Commander in the Eastern Region, with authority over around 2000 men. The involvement or role of Sen in the Cambodian genocide are unclear, although he denies complicity. Human Rights Watch suggested he may have had a role in a massacre to suppress Cham Muslim unrest in September–October 1975, but Sen has denied this, claiming that he had stopped following orders from the central government by this time. Sen claims he had increasing disagreements with Khmer Rouge authorities in the administration throughout 1975–1977.

In 1977, during internal purges of the Khmer Rouge regime, Hun Sen and his battalion cadres fled to Vietnam. During the Cambodian–Vietnamese War as Vietnam prepared to invade Cambodia, Hun Sen became one of the leaders of the Vietnamese-sponsored rebel army. He was given the secret name Mai Phúc by Vietnamese leaders.

Following the defeat of the Khmer Rouge regime, Hun Sen was appointed as Deputy Prime Minister and Foreign Minister of the Vietnamese-installed People's Republic of Kampuchea/State of Cambodia (PRK/SOC) in 1979 at age 26. The Vietnamese-appointed government appointed Sen some authority over the K5 Plan, a Khmer Rouge containment strategy that saw the mass mobilization of civilian labor in constructing barricades and land mines, although the extent of his involvement is unclear.

First appointment as Prime Minister 
Hun Sen first rose to the premiership in January 1985 when the one-party National Assembly appointed him to succeed Chan Sy, who had died in office in December 1984. As the de facto leader of Cambodia, in 1985, he was elected as Chairman of the Council of Ministers and Prime Minister. Sen oversaw continuing conflict against several ongoing insurgencies during this period.

In 1987, Amnesty International accused Hun Sen's government of torture of thousands of political prisoners using "electric shocks, hot irons and near-suffocation with plastic bags."

Paris Peace Talks and UNTAC (1991–1993) 
As Foreign Minister and then Prime Minister, Hun Sen played a role in the 1991 Paris Peace Talks, which brokered peace in Cambodia and formally ended the Cambodian–Vietnamese War.

He held the position of Prime Minister during the United Nations Transitional Authority in Cambodia (UNTAC) until the 1993 UN-sponsored elections, which resulted opposition party FUNCINPEC winning the majority of votes with a hung parliament. Hun Sen and his party formally rejected the result. With the support of much of the state apparatus, including the army and police, Hun Sen and his deputy Norodom Chakrapong threatened to lead the secession of seven provinces and CPP-backed forces committed violence against UN and FUNCINPEC forces although Sen distanced himself from the secessionist movement a few days later. UNTAC and FUNCINPEC conceded a unique power sharing agreement with Hun Sen serving as Second Prime Minister alongside First Prime Minister Norodom Ranariddh.

Co-premiership (1993–1997)

Conflict with Ranariddh

1997 coup 

In 1997, the coalition became unstable due to tensions between Ranariddh and Hun Sen. FUNCINPEC entered into discussions with the remaining Khmer Rouge rebels (with whom it had been allied against Hun Sen's Vietnamese-backed government during the 1980s), with the aim of absorbing them into its ranks. Such a development would have altered the balance of military power between royalists and the CPP.

In response, Hun Sen launched the 1997 coup, replacing Ranariddh with Ung Hout as the First Prime Minister and maintaining his position as the Second Prime Minister.

In an open letter, Amnesty International condemned the summary execution of FUNCINPEC ministers and the "systematic campaign of arrests and harassment" of political opponents. Thomas Hammarberg, then Special Representative of the Secretary-General for Human Rights in Cambodia, strongly condemned the coup.

Prime Minister of Cambodia 

In the 1998 election, he led the CPP to victory and forming a coalition with FUNCINPEC.

The 2003 Phnom Penh riots resulted in the ransacking of the Thai embassy in Cambodia, following comments made by Thai soap opera actress Suvanant Punnakant, who claimed that Angkor Wat belonged to Thailand. Sen called for a boycott of Thai goods and television shows and criticized the actress shortly before the riots. The riots and Sen's response severely damaged Cambodia–Thailand relations. Sen's Thai counterpart Thaksin Shinawatra closed the borders, expelled the Cambodian ambassador and evacuated Thai citizens from Phnom Penh in response. Thaksin also sent a warning to Hun Sen after witness reports suggested the army and police had not intervened until the embassy was destroyed. Sam Rainsy accused Sen of inciting the riot.

The elections of July 2003 resulted in a larger majority in the National Assembly for the CPP, with FUNCINPEC losing seats to the CPP and the Sam Rainsy Party. However, the CPP's majority was short of the two thirds constitutionally required for the CPP to form a government alone. This deadlock was overcome when a new CPP-FUNCINPEC coalition was formed in mid-2004, with Norodom Ranariddh chosen to be head of the National Assembly and Hun Sen again becoming sole Prime Minister.

From 2008 to 2013, the Cambodian–Thai border dispute was an ongoing conflict, which on a number of occasions led to fighting between Cambodian and Thai forces. Sen and Thai premier Abhisit Vejjajiva negotiated a de-escalation on several occasions with the encouragement of ASEAN. Cambodia was granted sovereignty over the Preah Vihear Temple area by a UN court in 2013, ending the dispute.

Sen has opposed extensive investigations and prosecutions related to crimes committed by former Khmer Rouge leaders by the UN-backed Khmer Rouge Tribunal.

On 6 May 2013, Hun Sen declared his intention to rule Cambodia until the age of 74.

2013–2014 protests 
After the July 2013 general elections both Hun Sen and his opponents Cambodia National Rescue Party claimed victory. In August, Hun Sen continued to pursue his aim of forming a new government. Cambodians in the United States, Canada and elsewhere, with hundreds of Buddhist Monks, peacefully protested in front of the United Nations in New York City on 19 August in opposition to Hun Sen's deployment of military and security forces in Phnom Penh, his unwillingness to share political power with opposition groups and seriously address earlier voting fraud and election irregularities.

One person was killed and others injured during protests in Phnom Penh in September 2013, where a reported 20,000 protesters gathered, some clashing with riot police. Following two weeks of opposition protests, Hun Sen declared that he had been constitutionally elected and would not step down nor hold a new election.

On 7 September 2013, tens of thousands of Cambodians, along with Buddhist monks and opposition groups, including Sam Rainsy's Cambodian National Rescue Party held mass demonstrations in Phnom Penh to protest the 28 July elections results which they claimed were flawed and marred by voting irregularities and potential fraud. The groups asked the United Nations to investigate and claimed that the elections results were not free and fair.

On 3 January 2014, military police opened fire at protesters, killing 4 people and injuring more than 20. The United Nations and US State Department condemned the violence. US Congressman Ed Royce responded to the report of violence in Cambodia by calling for Hun Sen to step down, saying that the Cambodian people deserve a better leader.

Consolidation of power (2015–present) 

On 10 June 2014, Hun Sen made a public appearance and claimed he has no health problems. He warned that if he were to die prematurely, the country would spin out of control and the opposition could expect trouble from the armed forces, saying he is the only person who can control the army.

In November 2016, Hun Sen publicly endorsed US Republican presidential candidate Donald Trump who went on to be elected president.

Following Hun Sen's orders, on 31 January 2017, the National Assembly voted unanimously to abolish the Minority Leader and Majority Leader positions to lessen the opposition party's influence. On 2 February 2017, Hun Sen barred the opposition from questioning some of his government ministers. Furthermore, Hun Sen vowed a constitutional amendment which later saw the opposition Cambodia National Rescue Party dissolved. This move led to the surprise resignation of opposition leader Sam Rainsy. The controversial law was passed on 20 February 2017, effectively granting the ruling party the right to dissolve political parties. Opposition leader Kem Sokha was later arrested for treason.

On 30 June 2018, weeks before the parliamentary elections, Hun Sen appointed his second eldest son, Hun Manet, into higher military positions. Some analysts have speculated Manet may be a future candidate for Sen's position. Hun Sen affirmed that his son could become prime minister if elected rather than through direct handover, though he intends to rule until at least 2028. The 2018 elections were dismissed as sham elections by the international community, the opposition party having been dissolved.

Hun Sen blocked the return of exiled Cambodia National Rescue Party leaders to Cambodia, including Sam Rainsy and Mu Sochua, in November 2019. He ordered the military to "attack" them on sight should they return, threatened airlines with legal actions for allowing them to board, deployed thousands of troops to the Thai and Vietnamese borders, and requested other ASEAN leaders arrest them and deport them to Cambodia.

In 2020, the European Union suspended its Everything but Arms preferential trade agreement with Cambodia due to concerns over human rights violations under Hun Sen's government. Sen criticized the move as "biased" and "unfair", including at the United Nations General Assembly in 2020.

During the early stages of the COVID-19 pandemic, Hun Sen downplayed the risk of the virus and declined to introduce preventative measures or evacuate Cambodian citizens from Wuhan during the initial outbreak in China. It was widely reported this was in an attempt to show solidarity with China, one of Cambodia's closest diplomatic and economic allies. Hun Sen visited China during the outbreak and offered to visit Wuhan specifically during its lockdown. In February 2020, at a press conference, he criticized the media for sensationalizing the virus, and threatened to expel those present who were wearing masks. Hun Sen was also present to welcome passengers of the MS Westerdam cruise ship to dock in Sihanoukville, after it was turned away from other countries. Cambodia started implementing preventative measures and travel restrictions from March 2020 as the pandemic spread globally.

A new State of Emergency Law prepared in response to COVID-19 granted Hun Sen further powers to restrict movement and assembly, seize private property and enforce quarantine. The new law has been criticised by Amnesty International for curbing human rights.

Corruption and land issues 
Hun Sen and his family were estimated to have amassed between US$500 million and US$1 billion by Global Witness in 2016, and a number of allies have also accumulated considerable personal wealth during his tenure. 

Hun Sen implemented land reform, the "leopard skin land reform", in Cambodia. Hun Sen's government has been responsible for leasing 45% of the total landmass in Cambodia—primarily to foreign investors—in the years 2007–08, threatening more than 150,000 Cambodians with eviction. Parts of the concessions are protected wildlife areas or national parks and have driven deforestation across the country. As of 2015, Cambodia had one of the highest rates of forest loss in the world. The land sales have been perceived by observers as government corruption and have resulted in thousands of citizens being forcibly evicted. According to Alice Beban, the land reform strengthened patronage politics in Cambodia and did not enable land tenure security.

Hun Sen was implicated in corruption related to Cambodia's oil wealth and mineral resources in the Global Witness 2009 report on Cambodia. He and his close associates were accused of carrying out secret negotiations with interested private parties, taking money from those who would be granted rights to exploit the country's resources in return. The credibility of this accusation has been challenged by government officials and especially Prime Minister Hun Sen, himself.

Human rights issues 
Sen and the CPP were accused of orchestrating summary executions during the 1997 coup.

Hun Sen frequently calls for violence against his political opponents during seemingly irrelevant public events, often characterizing this as necessary to maintain peace and stability in Cambodia. In 2017, he said he would be prepared to "eliminate 100 or 200 people if they would destabilize the peace in Cambodia" while speaking at commemoration for his defection from the Khmer Rouge. In 2019, as opposition party leaders prepared to return to the country, Sen ordered the military to "attack them wherever you see them—you don't need arrest warrants at all" while speaking at a graduation ceremony for exceptional high school students in Phnom Penh. He also threatened the European Union if they withdrew a commercial deal: "If you want the opposition dead, do it. If you want it alive, don't do it and come and talk", although they did not give in. "We didn't pursue you because we didn't want to kill you at the time," Hun Sen said to opposition leader Sam Rainsy, although such death threats have not been implemented.

Hun Sen's Cambodian People's Party (CPP) has banned public gatherings, driven opposition supporters from the site of former protest meetings 'Freedom Park', and deployed riot police to beat protesters and detain union leaders.

Several Australian politicians, most prominently Gareth Evans and Julian Hill, have been highly critical of Sen and his government over human rights issues and have called for changes to Australia–Cambodia relations.

After the execution of 4 prisoners in July 2022 in Myanmar, Hun Sen warned to rethink the peace agreement if the regime continued to execute prisoners.

Public image

In Cambodia, Hun Sen's core support base is from the majority of the population who reside in the countryside and work in the agricultural sector. He is less popular in urban centers like Phnom Penh.

Hun Sen's leadership has received criticism from various organizations, media and foreign governments for corruption, cronyism, environmental degradation, human rights violations and violence. Hun Sen and his government was described by former Prime Minister of Singapore Lee Kuan Yew in 2000 as "utterly merciless and ruthless, without humane feelings".

Alleged Vietnamese ties 

Some political opponents of Hun Sen have criticized him for alleged ties to Vietnam. Norodom Sihanouk once referred to him as a "one-eyed lackey of the Vietnamese", with Sam Rainsy and members of the Cambodia National Rescue Party later echoing similar sentiments during the 2010s. This is due to his position in the Vietnamese occupied government and prominence in figure in the People's Revolutionary Party of Kampuchea. Anti-Vietnamese sentiment and racism is common in Cambodia.

Control of media
Although Cambodia had relatively independent press during and immediately following the UNTAC era, Hun Sen and the CPP have since come to strictly control media in Cambodia. This has more recently encompassed social media, which surpassed traditional media as a news source for Cambodians in 2017.

Television, radio and newspapers 
Bayon Television is owned and operated by Hun Mana, Hun Sen's eldest daughter.  is joint-owned by Say Sam Al, CPP Minister of Environment and son of Say Chhum, CPP secretary and the son of CPP Deputy Prime Minister Sok An. CTN, CNC and MyTV are all owned by Khmer-Chinese tycoon, Kith Meng.

CPP officials claim that there is no connection between the TV stations and the state. However, CPP lawmaker and official spokesman Cheam Yeap once stated "We pay for that television [coverage] by buying broadcasting hours to show our achievements".

A demand for television and radio licenses was one of 10 opposition requests adopted by the Cambodia National Rescue Party (CNRP) at its "People's Congress" in October 2013.

Radio stations were banned from broadcasting Voice of America and Radio Free Asia in August 2017. The country's most prominent independent newspaper Cambodia Daily was closed on September 4, 2017, a day after the main opposition leader Kem Sokha was arrested for treason. The Phnom Penh Post, another widely circulated independent newspaper, was sold to a Malaysian investor with ties to Hun Sen in 2018, which undermined its independence and aligned it closer to the government.

Social media 
Facebook and the internet became widely used in Cambodia during the 2010s. It is thought that its adoption by the Cambodia National Rescue Party played a role in the party's gains in the 2013 election.

In the mid-2010s, Hun Sen and the Cambodian People's Party became enthusiastic users of Facebook. Hun Sen declared in February 2016 they had become an "electronic government" and regularly posts and livestreams speeches, announcements and selfies to million of followers. In 2017, Hun Sen's official page was the eighth-most liked Facebook page of any world leader and as of December 2020 is the most liked Facebook page in Cambodia.

Facebook activity is monitored by authorities, and criticism of the government and Prime Minister on Facebook has led to several arrests in the country. Cambodia has also prosecuted women who post images of themselves wearing revealing clothing on Facebook, with Hun Sen saying it is "a violation of culture and tradition" and invites sexual harassment. Amnesty International criticized this speech, characterizing it as "victim blaming" and contributing to violence against women.

Personal life

Hun Sen is married to Bun Rany. They have 6 children, including one adopted daughter: Kamsot (deceased), Manet, Mana, Manith, Mani and Mali. The couple also adopted a daughter (who is not named in news media sources) in 1988, but they legally disowned her in 2007 for being lesbian. In 2010, Manet was promoted Major General in the Royal Cambodian Armed Forces (RCAF) and became the Deputy Commander of the Prime Minister's Body Guard headquarters. All three of Hun Sen's sons play big roles in his government. His older brother, Hun Neng, was a governor of Kampong Cham and a member of parliament.

Hun Sen is fluent in Vietnamese, in addition to his native Khmer. Hun Sen also speaks some English after beginning to learn the language in the 1990s, but usually converses in Khmer through interpreters when giving formal interviews to the English-speaking media.

Hun Sen is blind in one eye because of an injury he sustained during the fall of Phnom Penh while fighting for the Khmer Rouge.

Hun Sen is a Buddhist. He has made major donations for the renovation of numerous pagodas, including Wat Vihear Suor.

Honours
National Orders:
  Grand Order of National Merit (1996)
Foreign Orders:
 Brunei:
 Recipient of the Sultan of Brunei Golden Jubilee Medal (2017)
 Cuba:
  Recipients of the Order of José Martí (1999)
 Laos:
  Gold Medal of the Nation (2008)
 Philippines:
  Grand Cross (Datu) of the Order of Sikatuna
 Russia:
  Recipients of the Order of Friendship (2021)
 Thailand:
  Knight Special Grand Cordon of the Order of the White Elephant (2001)
 Ukraine:
  Member 3rd Class of the Order of Prince Yaroslav the Wise (Awarded by Volodymyr Zelenskyy, 30 December 2022)

See also

Modern Cambodia
Politics of Cambodia
People's Republic of Kampuchea
Kleptocracy

Footnotes

Notes

References

Further reading

Elizabeth Becker. 1986, 1998. When the War Was Over: Cambodia and the Khmer Rouge. New York: Public Affairs. 
 Chandler, David. The Tragedy of Cambodian History: Politics, War, and Revolution since 1945 (Yale UP, 1991)
 Ciorciari, John D. "Cambodia in 2019: Backing Further into a Corner." Asian Survey 60.1 (2020): 125–131. online
 Deth, Sok Udom, and Serkan Bulut, eds. Cambodia's Foreign Relations in Regional and Global Contexts (Konrad-Adenauer-Stiftung, 2017; comprehensive coverage) full book online free.
 Path Kosal, "Introduction: Cambodia's Political History and Foreign Relations, 1945-1998" pp 1–26 
Harish C. Mehta and Julie B. Mehta. 1999. Hun Sen: Strongman of Cambodia. Singapore: Graham Brash Pte Ltd. 
 Peou, Sorpong. "Cambodia in 2018: a year of setbacks and successes." Southeast Asian Affairs 2019.1 (2019): 104–119. online
 Strangio, Sebastian. Cambodia: From Pol Pot to Hun Sen and Beyond (2020)
Biography of Hun Sen Cambodia New Vision ~ newsletter of cabinet of Cambodia's Prime Ministerial office
Alain Forest (2008), Cambodge contemporain, Indes Savantes,

External links
 

|-

|-

|-

|- 

 
|- 

 

 
|- 

 

 
|- 

 
1952 births
Living people
Cambodian Buddhists
Cambodian Theravada Buddhists
20th-century Cambodian politicians
21st-century Cambodian politicians
Cambodian people with disabilities
Cambodian military personnel
Cambodian revolutionaries
People of the Vietnam War
Khmer Rouge party members
Cambodian People's Party politicians
Foreign ministers of Cambodia
People from Kampong Cham province
People's Republic of Kampuchea
Cambodian politicians with disabilities
Cambodian politicians of Chinese descent
Prime Ministers of Cambodia
Cambodian nationalists
COVID-19 pandemic in Cambodia